JW-Police Football Club (Thai สมาคมสโมสรเจดับบลิวกรุ๊ป ), was a Thai professional football club based in Pathum Thani Province. The club was founded in 2004. They last played in Regional League Division 2 Central & Western region. They were dissolved in 2016.

Stadium and locations

Season By Season record

Honours

Domestic Leagues
Khǒr Royal Cup (ถ้วย ข)
 Winner (1) : 2013
Khor Royal Cup (ถ้วย ค)
 Winner (1) : 2009

External links
J.W.Bangkok U. football club official page

Defunct football clubs in Thailand
Football clubs in Thailand
Association football clubs established in 2004
Association football clubs disestablished in 2016
Prachuap Khiri Khan province
2004 establishments in Thailand
2016 disestablishments in Thailand